Xinrong is a station on Line 1 and Yangluo line of Wuhan Metro.

Line 1 station opened along with the completion of Line 1, Phase 2 on July 29, 2010. The Yangluo line station entered revenue service on December 26, 2017, it was named as Xinrong Long-Distance Bus Station, but on 30 December 2022 a transfer gateway within fare zones between Line 1 and Yangluo line has opened for business, and as a harmonious action of gateway open, the Yangluo line station has renamed to Xinrong.

It is an elevated station situated on Jiefang Avenue and located at the intersection of Jiefang Avenue and Hanhuang Road, with easy access to downtown bus transfers. The station has two side platforms serving trains from each direction.

Station layout
Xinrong Station is a three-story elevated station built entirely along Jiefang Avenue.

Exits
There are currently three exits in service:
Exit A: Northwest side of Jiefang Avenue. Accessible to Xinrong Long-Distance Bus Station.
Exit B: Northwest side of Jiefang Avenue.
Exit D: Southeast side of Jiefang Avenue.

Transfers
Bus transfers to Route 3, 4, 211, 212, 232, 234, 509, 577, 615, 727 and 809 are available at Xinrong Station.

References

Wuhan Metro stations
Line 1, Wuhan Metro
Railway stations in China opened in 2010